Eric Dewayne July (born 1990) is an American musician, YouTuber, comic book writer, and libertarian political commentator. He is the lead vocalist for the rap-metal band BackWordz, lead writer of the comic book series Isom, and a contributor for the Blaze TV network.

Early life
Eric July was born in Dallas, Texas, and grew up in Oak Cliff. His parents separated when he was a young child, and he lost contact with his father. After getting involved in gang activity as a teen, he was sent to Arkansas to live with his grandmother. Later he moved back to Dallas, where he was shot in the knee at one point and kicked out of multiple high schools despite being a talented track athlete. A narrow escape from a drive-by shooting and the death of a close friend caused July to reconsider his lifestyle. He attended the University of Memphis on a track and field scholarship. Later, he went to Texas A&M college in Corpus Christi, where he majored in communications. July says he changed his political views from far left to libertarian at this time when reading black economists such as Thomas Sowell and Walter Williams. He moved back to Dallas in March 2015.

Music career
July first performed under the name YG Ripple in Corpus Christi, and became involved in the hardcore metal scene there and in San Antonio. He played keyboards early on, then switched to vocals in the band Fire from the Gods. He formed the band BackWordz, in which he also performs vocals, in late 2014. In 2016, the band signed to the record label Stay Sick Recordings, run by Chris Fronzak, vocalist for the metalcore band Attila. BackWordz has been described as the libertarian Rage Against the Machine.

Comic book career
In July 2022, Eric July started a campaign selling comic books and merchandise for his first series, Isom, set in a new fictional universe called the Rippaverse, which is also the name of his publishing company. The campaign, with an original goal of $100,000, had raised nearly one million dollars in its first day, $1.7 million by July 15, $2.5 million by July 18, and $3 million by July 22.

Political activities
July campaigned for Barack Obama in 2008, but now describes himself as an anarcho-capitalist who tries "to get people thinking more critically about things." He helped found a group called Minorities Seeking Solutions, which he says aims to connect with young black males in particular and help empower them. He is a contributor for the Blaze TV network.

References

External links
 
 
 
 Rippaverse

1990 births
African-American comics creators
African-American singers
African-American male rappers
African-American writers
American libertarians
Commentary YouTubers
Music YouTubers
News YouTubers
People from Dallas
Living people
YouTube podcasters
YouTubers from Texas